Giulia Ronja Gwinn (born 2 July 1999) is a German professional footballer who plays as a right-back or a midfielder for Frauen-Bundesliga club FC Bayern Munich and the Germany women's national team.

Early life
Gwinn started playing football at the age of eight for TSG Ailingen and later for VfB Friedrichshafen. In 2009, she began a five-year spell at FV Ravensburg. She then played a season for the B-Juniors of SV Weingarten, as the only girl in the team.

Club career
In 2015, Gwinn joined Frauen-Bundesliga team SC Freiburg for the 2015–16 season at the age of 16 years. She had initially agreed to sign for Freiburg in February 2015, rejecting competing offers from Bayern Munich and Turbine Potsdam. On 13 September 2015, (3rd Round) she debuted in a 6–1 home win over 1. FC Köln. She substituted in for Sandra Starke, making her Bundesliga debut as a 16-year-old. A month later, on 11 October 2015 (5th Round), in the match against Werder Bremen, was her first time in the starting lineup. On 6 December 2015 (10th matchday) she scored in a 6–1 home win over Bayer Leverkusen.

On 25 February 2019, Gwinn agreed terms with Bayern Munich which would see her leave Freiburg at the end of the 2018–19 season.

International career

Youth
Gwinn has represented Germany on the under-15, under-16, under-17, under-19 and under-20 national teams. At the age of 13 years, she was called up by coach Bettina Wiegmann for under-15 national team training in November 2012. She made her debut for the U-15 national team in April 2013, a substitute in an 8–0 win over the Netherlands. She made three appearances for the under-16 national team in 2014. In 2015, she was the youngest player in the U-17 national team squad for the European Championship in Iceland where the team reached the semi-finals but were defeated 0–1 by the Swiss selection. UEFA's technical report noted that Gwinn's pace on the right wing had been a positive feature of Germany's play. In May 2016, the team won the 2016 UEFA Women's Under-17 Championship after a penalty shootout against Spain in Belarus. The four Freiburg players in the squad contributed seven of Germany's 10 goals at the tournament and two of them, including Gwinn, successfully converted their kicks in the shootout.

At the 2016 FIFA U-17 Women's World Cup in Jordan, Gwinn helped Germany beat Venezuela 2–1 in their opening match earning her the "Player of the Match" award. She scored the first goal with a volley, then assisted on the second. Entering the tournament with 23 Under-17 caps and as a first team player with Freiburg, Gwinn was considered one of the pillars of the team. In the Germans' second match against Canada, Gwinn's direct free kick salvaged a 1–1 draw. In the third match, Gwinn scored a goal in Germany's victory over Cameroon.

She played in the 2017 UEFA Women's Under-19 Championship (scoring a goal against Scotland) in Northern Ireland where she reached the semi-final and with this she qualified for the 2018 FIFA U-20 Women's World Cup (where scored a goal against China and was named "Player of the Match" against Nigeria).

Senior
On 14 May 2019, Gwinn was named to the 2019 FIFA Women's World Cup German squad.  In her FIFA Women's World Cup debut, she secured the win for Germany in their opening game of the 2019 FIFA Women's World Cup by scoring the only goal in a 1–0 group-stage victory over China. She was named "Player of the Match" for her contribution. The German World Cup campaign ended in the quarterfinals after a 2–1 loss to Sweden. Gwinn was later awarded with the Best Young Player Award for her performance at the tournament.

Career statistics

Scores and results list Germany's goal tally first, score column indicates score after each Gwinn goal.

Personal life
She is the youngest of four siblings.

Honours
Bayern Munich
Frauen-Bundesliga: 2020–21
Germany

 UEFA Women's Championship runner-up: 2022
Germany U17
UEFA Women's Under-17 Championship: 2016
Individual
FIFA Women's World Cup Best Young Player: 2019
UEFA Women's Championship Team of the Tournament: 2022

References

External links

 
 
 

1999 births
Living people
People from Friedrichshafen
Sportspeople from Tübingen (region)
Footballers from Baden-Württemberg
German women's footballers
Women's association football midfielders
SC Freiburg (women) players
FC Bayern Munich (women) players
Frauen-Bundesliga players
Germany women's international footballers
2019 FIFA Women's World Cup players
UEFA Women's Euro 2022 players
21st-century German women